Baumslag group can refer to:
Baumslag–Gersten group
Baumslag–Solitar group